the estate of Giehl
Brett Giehl aka Dalton Castle (wrestler)
Tobias Giehl, athlete